The R-39 Rif (NATO reporting name: SS-N-20 Sturgeon; bilateral arms control designation: RSM-52) was a submarine-launched ballistic missile (SLBM) that served with the Soviet Navy from its introduction in 1983 until 1991, after which it served with the Russian Navy until 2004. The missile had GRAU indices of 3M65, 3M20, and 3R65. It was carried on board Typhoon-class submarines.

An intercontinental missile, the R-39 had a three-stage solid-fuel boost design with a liquid-fuel post-boost unit carrying up to ten multiple independently targetable reentry vehicle warheads.  Like other SLBMs the initial launch was powered by a gas generator in the bottom of the firing tube.  During the missile's passage through the water additional motors produce a gaseous wall around the missile, reducing hydrodynamic resistance.  The launch system was designated "D-19".

Development
Development work began at NII Mashinostroyeniya in 1971 and the design gained official approval in 1973. Initial test flights from 1979 found problems in the solid-fuel boost engines, over half of the early flights failed. Later tests aboard a modified Typhoon-class submarine were more successful and deployment began in May 1983, with 20 missiles in each submarine. At full deployment, 120 missiles were deployed with 1,200 total warheads.

Under the terms of the START I and START II treaties, from 1996 a number of R-39 missiles were destroyed. Throughout the 1990s, Typhoon class submarines and the R-39 missiles they carried were gradually withdrawn from service. All the missiles were decommissioned by 2004 and all the Typhoon class submarines have been retired, except for one which is used as a test platform for the RSM-56 Bulava.

A successor design, R-39M Grom (Thunder)/RSM-52V/SS-N-28 for D-19UTTKh launch system, suffered a succession of testing failures and was cancelled.

Operators

Former operators
 
 Russian Navy
 
 Soviet Navy

See also
 R-39M
 R-29 Vysota
 R-29RM Shtil
 R-29RMU Sineva
 R-29RMU2 Layner
 RSM-56 Bulava
 UGM-133 Trident II
 M45 (missile)
 M51 (missile)
 JL-1
 JL-2
 K Missile family
 Pukkuksong-1

References

External links
Russian nuclear forces 2005, The Bulletin of the Atomic Scientists, March/April 2005.
GlobalSecurity.org data on R-39
GlobalSecurity.org data on R-39M
GlobalSecurity.org data on Typhoon submarines

Submarine-launched ballistic missiles of the Soviet Union
Submarine-launched ballistic missiles of Russia
Makeyev Rocket Design Bureau
Military equipment introduced in the 1980s